Fruit pudding is a Scottish dish which is a mixture of wheat or oatmeal flour or breadcrumbs, beef suet, brown sugar, currants, raisins, sultanas, salt and cinnamon, formed into the shape of a large sausage.

Normally cut into slices and fried, it is an optional feature of the traditional Scottish breakfast. Although served in this context as part of a savoury meal, its close relationship to clootie dumpling means it may also be served as a dessert.

Many Scottish producers of sausage, sliced sausage, black pudding, white pudding and haggis also make fruit pudding.
It is not uncommon to find a "breakfast pack" consisting of sausage, sliced sausage, black pudding and fruit pudding on sale in Scottish shops.

In London, rock musician Alex Harvey purchased his Scottish breakfast supplies, including fruit pudding, from Fortnum and Mason.

References

Reference bibliography 

 
 
 
 
 

Scottish sausages
Puddings
Scottish cuisine
Sausage dishes